Luke the Dog (19131926) was a Staffordshire Terrier that performed as a recurring character in American silent comedy shorts between 1914 and 1920. He was also the personal pet of actress Minta Durfee and her husband, the comedian and director Roscoe "Fatty" Arbuckle.

For six years Luke gained widespread popularity among movie audiences, appearing in one- and two-reelers for Keystone Studios, Comique Film Company, and Joseph M. Schenck Productions. The Staffordshire terrier shared screen time not only with Arbuckle and Durfee but also with other stars and top supporting players of the silent era, including Mabel Normand, Buster Keaton, Al St. John, Molly Malone, Joe Roberts,  Betty Compson, and Edgar Kennedy.

Early life

Luke the Dog was born in November 1913, reportedly at the home of film director Wilfred Lucas in Los Angeles, California. It was there where Minta Durfee and Roscoe Arbuckle were said to have acquired Luke as a six-week-old puppy. Several sources about the dog's early life state that Lucas gave the puppy to Minta in lieu of extra money or hazard pay she had earned for performing a dangerous stunt in one of his motion pictures. Some of those same sources also state that Minta and Roscoe even named their new pet after the tight-fisted director, dubbing him Luke as a familiar form of "Lucas" The cited timing of the dog's birth in November 1913 seems consistent with Luke's physical appearance in his film debut in the short Lover's Luck, released in mid-September 1914 and likely completed in August that year. In the "one-reeler", which features both Roscoe and Minta, Luke can be seen in the background in several scenes, tethered next to his doghouse. Luke's size in the short shows a dog of his breed nearing maturity.

Film career
While Luke was originally given to Minta Durfee, Roscoe Arbuckle quickly became the dominant figure in the dog's daily life, for it was "Fatty" who invested the most time training the animal to do tricks. Following his debut as a background pooch in Lover's Luck, Luke worked in no fewer than a dozen more shorts released between January 1915 and December 1920. Luke next appears in Mabel and Fatty's Wash Day. He has one very brief scene in that 1915 one-reeler, receiving a few affectionate pats from Mabel Normand as she goes into her backyard to hang laundry. In Luke's third film, Fatty's Faithful Fido, released just two months after Mabel and Fatty's Wash Day, the success of his training and his remarkable athleticism are finally displayed to audiences.

Luke performs a series of stunts in Fatty's Faithful Fido that are among the most impressive of his career. He gives chase to fellow cast member Al St. John, who in the one-reeler plays Fatty's rival for the affections of a young woman portrayed by Minta. In his pursuit of St. John, Luke climbs a tall ladder propped against a wall, missteps and plunges off a building's roof, recovers, crosses another ladder between rooftops, jumps from one roof to another, seizes between his teeth the coat of Fatty's rival and rips it off his body, and then grabs the desperate man's necktie and starts choking him. St. John finally manages to escape but only when Luke is distracted by a passing cat. Later in the day the dog locates him at a community dance and charges into the event. The film ends with Luke, St. John, and Fatty falling through a hole in the floor and landing together in a large laundry tub of water.

Luke has his longest screen time in a single film in Fatty's Plucky Pup, also released in 1915. He performs in almost every scene of the 26-minute two-reeler. In the short's early scenes, Luke proves to be an elusive target for two dogcatchers; and later the "plucky pup" becomes a hero, rescuing Fatty's girlfriend Lizzie from a pair of crooks who are assisted by the two dogcatchers. One of the interesting visual effects in Fatty's Plucky Pup relied on the use of a treadmill in combination with the carousel-like "cyclorama" often used by cameramen at Keystone Studios' facilities in Edendale, California. There are sequences in the short showing Luke in close-up and running at breakneck speed through the countryside. The dog in reality was running on a treadmill positioned between a stationary camera and the cyclorama's rotating platform with background scenery hand-painted on a huge central cylinder or hub. The cyclorama, which can be seen in operation at Keystone in a surviving period film clip, creates an effective but cartoonish simulation of Luke dashing across the landscape.

19161920

By 1916, Luke began to demonstrate that his athletic abilities were not limited to racing on the ground and vaulting through the air; he was equally proficient in water. Playing Arbuckle's faithful companion again in the two-reeler Fatty and Mabel Adrift, Luke chases Fatty's frequent nemesis, Al St. John, into the ocean, diving into the surf and pursuing the villain into deep water. Later in the film, Luke swims beachward to save Fatty and Mabel, whose honeymoon seaside cottage has been set adrift and is sinking.

Following his work on Fatty and Mabel Adrift, Arbuckle left Keystone to make films independently. Luke, of course, followed Roscoe and continued to appear in such films as The Butcher Boy (1917), The Cook (1918), and The Hayseed (1919). In its review of The Butcher Boy in April 1917, the entertainment trade paper Variety compliments the film and observes, "The cast fits the star [Arbuckle], and not the least important member is 'Luke,' the bull terrier. It is a wonder." Luke's extended absence from the screen after The Butcher Boy was noticed by movie fans, who wanted to see more of him. In its September 1918 issue, the fan publication Motion Picture Magazine announces the return of the popular canine performer for the production of The Cook. "Luke", it reports, "the famous bull terrier, the pride of Fatty Arbuckle's heart, returned to his master recently, and will appear in Fatty's travesties for fifty bones a week."

Luke's reliability and experience as a performer earned him a top salary during his career of $150 a week ($ today). His last two performances were in 1920, both uncredited: The Garage with Arbuckle and Fatty's comedic protégé Buster Keaton and The Scarecrow with only Keaton. In those final shorts, a stockier, more muscular Luke continues to display his skills as a man-chaser. Keaton's character in The Scarecrow runs in a panic from Luke, thinking the dog is rabid because he is foaming or "frothing" at the mouth. Actually, Luke had just eaten a cream pie and remnants of the cream remained around his snout. The "mad" dog relentlessly pursues Keaton over brick walls, up ladders again, around the top of a building, over planks, through windows, down a garbage chute, and through haystacks.

Later years and death

Luke continued to spend most of his time with Roscoe until Arbuckle and Minta separated in 1921 and finally divorced in 1925. Minta gained custody of the dog as part of the couple's separation agreement and divorce settlement, although Roscoe did have visitation rights to see him. That arrangement may explain why the veteran stunt dog did not appear again on screen after his work with Keaton in The Scarecrow in 1920.

A tragic scandal that rocked Arbuckle's personal and professional life in 1921 may have also affected Luke's career and be another reason for the dog's apparent retirement from performing. The public closely identified Luke with Fatty, whose stardom ended as a result of the noted scandal. Arbuckle's films were effectively banned from many theaters for a while, and even some things associated with the former comedy star were shunned by moviegoers and the media as well. Whatever the reasons for Luke's absence from films after 1920, records suggest that he lived the remaining years of his life with Minta. Luke died in 1926 in Los Angeles at age 13, in keeping with the average life expectancy of his breed. It is unknown where his remains were interred.

Filmography

Lover's Luck (1914)
Mabel and Fatty's Wash Day (1915)
Fatty's New Role (1915)
Fatty's Faithful Fido (1915)
Fatty's Plucky Pup (1915)
Fatty and Mabel Adrift (1916)
The Butcher Boy (1917)
Coney Island (1917)
The Cook (1918)
The Sheriff (1918)
The Hayseed (1919)
The Garage (1920)
The Scarecrow (1920)

See also
 List of individual dogs
 Teddy the Great Dane

Notes

References

External links

 

1913 animal births
1926 animal deaths
Dog actors